Level Plains is a small town in Dale County, Alabama, United States. At the 2020 census, the population was 1,825. It is part of the Ozark micropolitan statistical area. Level Plains was ranked as a city from 2010 to 2020, but due to a population decline reverted to a town after the 2020 Census.

Mayor Ronnie Thompson is the current and ninth mayor to serve since the town was incorporated on April 30, 1965.  Thompson previously served as councilmember.

Geography
Level Plains is located in southwestern Dale County at  (31.313659, -85.767307), between Daleville to the east and Enterprise to the west. U.S. Route 84 passes through the middle of the community.

Demographics

2020 census

As of the 2020 United States census, there were 1,825 people, 719 households, and 518 families residing in the town.

2010 census
As of the census of 2010, there were 2,085 people with 866 housing units with 801 occupied in the incorporated area. The increase in population by 541 people from the 2000 census changed Level Plains' designation from a town to a small city. The racial makeup of the town was 90.86% White, 9.42% Black or African American, 1.00% Native American, 0.56% Asian, 1.36% from other races, and 2.91% from two or more races. 3.04% of the population were Hispanic or Latino of any race.

There were 602 households, out of which 36.7% had children under the age of 18 living with them, 58.5% were married couples living together, 11.0% had a female householder with no husband present, and 26.2% were non-families. 21.9% of all households were made up of individuals, and 6.3% had someone living alone who was 65 years of age or older. The average household size was 2.55 and the average family size was 2.95.

In the town the population was spread out, with 26.5% under the age of 18, 7.3% from 18 to 24, 33.3% from 25 to 44, 23.0% from 45 to 64, and 10.0% who were 65 years of age or older. The median age was 37 years. For every 100 females, there were 104.5 males. For every 100 females age 18 and over, there were 101.2 males.

The median income for a household in the town was $38,269, and the median income for a family was $44,432. Males had a median income of $33,182 versus $20,313 for females. The per capita income for the town was $17,423. About 8.9% of families and 9.2% of the population were below the poverty line, including 8.1% of those under age 18 and 16.7% of those age 65 or over.

Government 
The Town Hall is located at 1708 Joe Bruer Road, which is also known as the old Alabama state route 134. The Level Plains town government includes a mayor and five town council members, a town clerk, a court magistrate, a police department, water department and a volunteer fire department. The town is served by both the Daleville and Enterprise U.S. Postal offices, with the town hall using the Daleville 36322 postal address. The primary north-south road is Dale County Road 1, with U.S. Highway 84 bisecting west to east through the middle of the incorporated areas.

See also

 List of cities in Alabama

References

External links

  WiregrassLive.com - Citizen-driven news and messages

Cities in Dale County, Alabama
Cities in Alabama
1965 establishments in Alabama